Euriphene iris is a butterfly in the family Nymphalidae. It is found in the Democratic Republic of the Congo (Shaba), Tanzania, northern Zambia and Angola. The habitat consists of miombo woodland.

References

Butterflies described in 1903
Euriphene
Butterflies of Africa
Taxa named by Per Olof Christopher Aurivillius